Will Ribeiro (born February 17, 1983) is a retired Brazilian mixed martial artist and Luta Livre Esportiva (brown belt) practitioner, fighting out of Rio de Janeiro, Brazil.

Biography

Born in Campo Grande, a suburb of the city of Rio de Janeiro Will Ribeiro was raised along with his three siblings by his grandfather and mother, never having known their father. After the passing of their mother, Will and his family had to struggle to stay afloat, and the then 20-year-old Ribeiro took a career as a prizefighter to help support his family.

Will, who begun his training as a boxer in the age of 17, soon started to draw attention for his achievements in the sport, winning five straight titles in the state of Rio de Janeiro, also winning important titles such as the Copa Brasil de Boxe and the Torneio de São Paulo Eder Jofre. Ribeiro was then chosen as part of the Brazilian Olympic boxing team, in Santo André, São Paulo.

Mixed martial arts career

After making waves at fight events in Brazil, and quickly becoming a bantamweight prospect in MMA, including the Brazilian chapter of Shooto, Will Ribeiro was signed by World Extreme Cagefighting, debuting against the American Chase Beebe, and winning by a split decision.  Afterwards, Will faced bantamweight standout Brian Bowles, being defeated by submission due to a guillotine choke in the third round. Will was a solid part of many rankings of his division, and was ranked the 9th top bantamweight fighter by Sherdog.

Injury and rehabilitation

On December 16, 2008, Ribeiro was critically injured while riding on the back of a motorcycle on rain-slick wet roads without a helmet. He was in a hospital in a comatose state and has lost vision in one eye. Doctors gave him a 50/50 chance of ever waking from the coma. By December 23, doctors reported that he had not awoken from the coma, but that his condition was improving. This very unfortunate incident has effectively ended Ribeiro's Mixed Martial Arts career. At the time of his accident Will was ranked as the #7 Bantamweight fighter in the world by the MMAWeekly Worldwide MMA Ranking System.

Will Ribeiro has reportedly awoken from an induced coma and is recovering well after being hospitalized since December. According to Tatame.com, Luiz Alves, Ribeiro’s Muay Thai coach, recently visited him in the hospital and was surprised to see that Ribeiro was able to talk to him and is currently undergoing therapy after doctors stated he had a 50-50 chance to live due to his injuries suffered in the accident.

Almost two months after the serious accident that almost cost his life, Luiz Alves, his Muay Thai trainer, commemorates the excellent recovery of the WEC fighter.

“I had visited him at Christmas and then in January, but I left very sad and swore I wouldn’t return there anymore. He was swollen, very thin… But I was there yesterday and left very happy, because he spoke with me, remember everything that happened, kissed me”, revealed Luiz. “He is already in the ward, it’s better because he can watch TV now, he’s doing physiotherapy, is eating well and is excited”.

As of September 2010, Ribeiro is still recovering from his near fatal injuries.

In December 2010, a Shooto Brazil event was held, with all of its earnings going towards Will Ribeiro's treatment. The representative of Shooto Brazil, André Pederneiras, decided to hold the event to raise funds towards Will's cranioplasty surgery. In May 2011, Will underwent a successfully cranioplasty surgery. Ribeiro is back to the fighting world, acting as a boxing instructor and a cageside referee. Will Ribeiro also works with social projects in the city of Rio de Janeiro, teaching boxing lessons for impoverished youth.

Mixed martial arts record

|-
| Loss
| align=center| 10–2
| Brian Bowles
| Submission (guillotine choke)
| WEC 37: Torres vs. Tapia
| 
| align=center| 3
| align=center| 1:11
| Las Vegas, Nevada, United States
| 
|-
| Win
| align=center| 10–1
| Chase Beebe
| Decision (split)
| WEC 34: Faber vs. Pulver
| 
| align=center| 3 
| align=center| 5:00
| Sacramento, California, United States
| 
|-
| Win
| align=center| 9–1
| Andre Lobo
| KO (punches)
| Shooto - Brazil 5
| 
| align=center| 1 
| align=center| 0:09
| Rio de Janeiro, Brazil
| 
|-
| Win
| align=center| 8–1
| William Vianna
| KO (punch)
| Shooto - Brazil 4
| 
| align=center| 3 
| align=center| N/A
| Rio de Janeiro, Brazil
| 
|-
| Win
| align=center| 7–1
| D'Angelo de Souza Vieira
| KO (knee to the body)
| Conquista Fight 3
| 
| align=center| 1
| align=center| 0:16
| Brazil
| 
|-
| Loss
| align=center| 6–1
| Erinaldo Pitbull
| Decision (unanimous)
| Shooto - Brazil 11
| 
| align=center| 3 
| align=center| 5:00
| Rio de Janeiro, Brazil
| 
|-
| Win
| align=center| 6–0
| D'Angelo de Souza Vieira
| Decision (split)
| Top Fighter MMA 2
|  
| align=center| 3
| align=center| 5:00
| Rio de Janeiro, Brazil
| 
|-
| Win
| align=center| 5–0
| Daniel Siqueira 
| KO (punches)
| Juiz de Fora - Fight 3
|  
| align=center| 1 
| align=center| N/A
| Brazil
| 
|-
| Win
| align=center| 4–0
| Washington dos Anjos 
| Submission (punches)
| Submission PC: Pantanal Combat
| 
| align=center| 2
| align=center| 2:01
| Brazil
| 
|-
| Win
| align=center| 3–0
| Luis Rogerio de Agostinho
| TKO (upkick to the body)
| Minotauro Fights 1
| 
| align=center| 1
| align=center| 4:00
| Macapá, Amapa, Brazil
| 
|-
| Win
| align=center| 2–0
| Dini Dini
| Decision (unanimous)
| IMVT - Iron Man Vale Tudo
| 
| align=center| 3
| align=center| 5:00
| Macapá, Amapa, Brazil
| 
|-
| Win
| align=center| 1–0
| Gabriel Barros
| Submission (side choke)
| Conquista Fight 1
| 
| align=center| 2
| align=center| 4:05
| Vitoria da Conquista, Bahia, Brazil
|

References

External links

Professional MMA record

1983 births
Living people
People from Campo Grande
Brazilian male mixed martial artists
Bantamweight mixed martial artists
Mixed martial artists utilizing boxing
Mixed martial artists utilizing Muay Thai
Mixed martial artists utilizing taekwondo
Mixed martial artists utilizing Luta Livre
Mixed martial artists utilizing Brazilian jiu-jitsu
Brazilian Muay Thai practitioners
Brazilian practitioners of Brazilian jiu-jitsu
Brazilian male taekwondo practitioners
Sportspeople from Mato Grosso do Sul